John Clarence Woods (June 5, 1911 – July 21, 1950) was a United States Army master sergeant who, with Joseph Malta, carried out the Nuremberg executions of ten former top leaders of the Third Reich on October 16, 1946, after they were sentenced to death at the Nuremberg trials. Time magazine credited him with 347 executions to that date during a 15-year career. According to later research, a number of 60 to 70 over a period of two years is more credible.

Biography 
Born in Wichita, Kansas, Woods joined the U.S. Navy on December 3, 1929, and went absent without leave within months. He was convicted at a general court martial and subsequently examined by a psychiatric board on April 23, 1930. He was diagnosed with "Constitutional Psychopathic Inferiority without Psychosis", was found "poor service material" and discharged. Before being inducted into the United States Army in August 1943, Woods was intermittently employed in construction as a laborer, and was working part-time at a feed-store in Eureka, Kansas, when he was registered for Selective Service in 1940. He married a nurse, Hazel Chilcott, but had no children.

Before D-Day, U.S. military executions by hanging in the European Theater of Operations occurred in Southern England only and were performed by the civilian executioner Thomas Pierrepoint with assistance by Albert Pierrepoint (his nephew) and other British personnel. When in autumn of 1944 military executions by hanging were scheduled in France, the Army looked for a volunteer enlisted hangman and found Woods, who falsely claimed previous experience as assistant hangman in two cases in Texas and two in Oklahoma. There is no evidence that the U.S. Army made any attempt to verify Woods's claims—if they had checked, it would have been easy to prove that he was lying; the states of Texas and Oklahoma had both switched to electrocution during the period he claimed to be a hangman. The last hanging in Texas took place in August 1923 when Woods would have been twelve. Oklahoma did not carry out hangings during the relevant period, the last one taking place three months before Woods was born. There was a single hanging in 1936 under federal jurisdiction, and all other executions in Oklahoma between 1915 and 1966 were carried out by electric chair.  

In fact, Woods had no documented pre-war experience as a hangman. Woods at that time was a private and a member of the 37th Engineer Combat Battalion. He was promoted to master sergeant and transferred to Paris Disciplinary Training Center. Woods performed as the primary executioner in the hangings of 34 U.S. soldiers at various locations in France over 1944–1945, and assisted in at least three others. U.S. Army reports suggest that Woods participated in at least 11 bungled hangings of U.S. soldiers between 1944 and 1946.

Woods also participated in the execution of about 45 war criminals at various locations which included Rheinbach, Bruchsal, Landsberg, and Nuremberg. Donald E. Wilkes Jr., a professor of law at the University of Georgia Law School, wrote that many of the Nazis executed at Nuremberg fell from the gallows with a drop insufficient to snap their necks, resulting in their death by strangulation that in some cases lasted several minutes.

After the Nuremberg executions, Woods stated:

While serving with the 7th Engineer Brigade in Eniwetok, Marshall Islands, on July 21, 1950, Woods died after accidentally electrocuting himself while attempting to repair an engineer lighting set. He is buried in Toronto Township Cemetery, Toronto, Kansas.

References

Sources

External links
Richard Clark: "Hanged by the neck until you are dead."

1911 births
1950 deaths
Accidental deaths by electrocution
Accidental deaths in the Marshall Islands
American executioners
Nuremberg trials
People from Wichita, Kansas
Military personnel from Kansas
United States Army personnel of World War II
United States Army soldiers